Carolyn Ann Pickles (born 2 May 1941) is a former Australian politician. She was a Labor member of the South Australian Legislative Council from 1985 to 2002. As Leader of the Opposition in the Legislative Council, she was the first woman elected to lead a major Australian political party in any chamber in South Australia.

References

1941 births
Living people
Members of the South Australian Legislative Council
Place of birth missing (living people)
Australian Labor Party members of the Parliament of South Australia
20th-century Australian politicians
21st-century Australian politicians
Women members of the South Australian Legislative Council
20th-century Australian women politicians
21st-century Australian women politicians